Xeniostoma is a genus of sea snails, marine gastropod mollusks in the family Calliostomatidae within the superfamily Trochoidea, the top snails, turban snails and their allies.

Species
Species within the genus Xeniostoma include:
 Xeniostoma inexpectans McLean, 2012

References

External links
 To World Register of Marine Species

 
Calliostomatidae
Monotypic gastropod genera